Vlado Kotur (born 28 November 1958) is a former Bosnian-Herzegovinian footballer and current coach.

Playing career
As a player, Kotur played for Borac Banja Luka and NK Rijeka.

External links
http://www.dubickaraja.com/content/view/371/347/

1958 births
Living people
People from Dubica, Bosnia and Herzegovina
Serbs of Bosnia and Herzegovina
Association football midfielders
Yugoslav footballers
Yugoslavia under-21 international footballers
HNK Rijeka players
FK Borac Banja Luka players
Yugoslav First League players